Subject is the debut studio album by American musician Dwele. It was released on May 20, 2003 via Virgin Records. Production was mainly handled by Dwele himself, in addition to G-1, Dwayne Bastiany, Jake and the Phatman, Pete Kuzma, Joint Custody, and Ronald "Ron E." Estill, who also served as executive producer together with Timothy Maynor. It features guest appearance from Slum Village. The album peaked at number 108 on the Billboard 200 and number 20 on the Top R&B/Hip-Hop Albums.

Track listing

Personnel
 Dwele: lead and background vocals, drum programming, bass, guitar, keyboards, Fender Rhodes, trumpet, flugelhorn
 Jake and the Phatman: drum programming, turntables, percussion
 George "G-One" Archie: drum programming, synthesizers, Fender Rhodes
 Dave Foreman: guitar
 Kelvin Wooten: bass, guitar
 Todd Fairall, Chris Puram, Michelle Romero, Eric Roberson, Nikki Holliwood: Recording engineer
 Ronald Estill, Serban Ghenea, Kirk Yano, Dylan Koski-Budabin, Jean-Marie Horvat: mixing
 Tom Coyne: mastering
 Ronald Estill, Timothy Maynor: Executive producer
 Amanda Friedman, Andrew Dosunmu: Photography
 Bento Design: Art direction & design

Charts

Weekly charts

Year-end charts

References

External links

Dwele albums
2003 debut albums
Virgin Records albums
Albums produced by G-One